The Aid and Rescue Committee, or Va'adat Ha-Ezrah ve-ha-Hatzalah be-Budapesht (Vaada for short; name in ) was a small committee of Zionists in Budapest, Hungary, in 1944–1945, who helped Hungarian Jews escape the Holocaust during the German occupation of that country. The Committee was also known as the Rescue and Relief Committee, and the Budapest Rescue Committee.

The main personalities of the Vaada were Ottó Komoly, president; Rudolf Kasztner, executive vice-president; Samuel Springmann, treasurer; and Joel Brand, who was in charge of tijul or the underground rescue of Jews. Other members were Hansi Brand (Joel Brand's wife);  Erno Szilagyi from the left-wing Hashomer Hatzair; Peretz Revesz; Andras Biss; and Nison Kahan. After the German occupation in March 1944 responsibilities were split: Otto Komoly became mainly in charge of dealing with Hungarian government, military and police figures (the so-called 'line A'), while Kasztner (after Brand's departure to Istanbul) led the negotiations with the Germans (the so-called 'line B') including Eichmann.

See also
Adolf Eichmann
History of the Jews in Hungary
Kastner train
Kurt Becher

References

Further reading

Molnár, Judit: Otto Komoly Diary
Weitz, Y (2011) The Man Who Was Murdered Twice: The Life, Trial and Death of Israel Kasztner, Jerusalem: Yad Vashem. 

Blood for goods
Jewish resistance during the Holocaust
Jewish emigration from Nazi Germany
Organizations which rescued Jews during the Holocaust
The Holocaust in Hungary
Zionism in Hungary